The Boy or Girl paradox surrounds a set of questions in probability theory, which are also known as The Two Child Problem, Mr. Smith's Children and the Mrs. Smith Problem. The initial formulation of the question dates back to at least 1959, when Martin Gardner featured it in his October 1959 "Mathematical Games column" in Scientific American. He titled it The Two Children Problem, and phrased the paradox as follows:
Mr. Jones has two children. The older child is a girl. What is the probability that both children are girls?
Mr. Smith has two children. At least one of them is a boy. What is the probability that both children are boys?

Its answer could be , depending on the procedure by which the information "at least one of them is a boy" was obtained. The ambiguity, depending on the exact wording and possible assumptions, was confirmed by Maya Bar-Hillel and Ruma Falk, and Raymond S. Nickerson.

Other variants of this question, with varying degrees of ambiguity, have been popularized by Ask Marilyn in Parade Magazine, John Tierney of The New York Times, and Leonard Mlodinow in The Drunkard's Walk. One scientific study showed that when identical information was conveyed, but with different partially ambiguous wordings that emphasized different points, the percentage of MBA students who answered  changed from 85% to 39%.

The paradox has stimulated a great deal of controversy. The paradox stems from whether the problem setup is similar for the two questions. This answer is intuitive if the question leads the reader to believe that there are two equally likely possibilities for the sex of the second child (i.e., boy and girl), and that the probability of these outcomes is absolute, not conditional.

Common assumptions
The two possible answers share a number of assumptions. First, it is assumed that the space of all possible events can be easily enumerated, providing an extensional definition of outcomes: {BB, BG, GB, GG}. This notation indicates that there are four possible combinations of children, labeling boys B and girls G, and using the first letter to represent the older child. Second, it is assumed that these outcomes are equally probable. This implies the following model, a Bernoulli process with p = :

Each child is either male or female.
Each child has the same chance of being male as of being female.
The sex of each child is independent of the sex of the other.

The mathematical outcome would be the same if it were phrased in terms of a coin toss.

First question
 Mr. Jones has two children. The older child is a girl. What is the probability that both children are girls?

Under the aforementioned assumptions, in this problem, a random family is selected. In this sample space, there are four equally probable events:

Only two of these possible events meet the criteria specified in the question (i.e., GG, GB).

Second question
 Mr. Smith has two children. At least one of them is a boy. What is the probability that both children are boys?

This question is identical to question one, except that instead of specifying that the older child is a boy, it is specified that at least one of them is a boy. In response to reader criticism of the question posed in 1959, Gardner said that no answer is possible without information that was not provided. Specifically, that two different procedures for determining that "at least one is a boy" could lead to the exact same wording of the problem. But they lead to different correct answers:

 From all families with two children, at least one of whom is a boy, a family is chosen at random.
 From all families with two children, one child is selected at random, and the sex of that child is specified to be a boy.

Grinstead and Snell argue that the question is ambiguous in much the same way Gardner did. They leave it to the reader to decide whether the procedure, that yields 1/3 as the answer, is reasonable for the problem as stated above. The formulation of the question they were considering specifically is the following: 
Consider a family with two children. Given that one of the children is a boy, what is the probability that both children are boys?
In this formulation the ambiguity is most obviously present, because it is not clear whether we are allowed to assume that a specific child is a boy, leaving the other child uncertain, or whether it should be interpreted in the same way as "at least one boy". This ambiguity leaves multiple possibilities that are not equivalent and leaves the necessity to make assumptions about how the information was obtained, as Bar-Hillel and Falk argue, where different assumptions can lead to different outcomes (because the problem statement was not well enough defined to allow a single straightforward interpretation and answer).

For example, say an observer sees Mr. Smith on a walk with just one of his children. If he has two boys then that child must be a boy. But if he has a boy and a girl, that child could have been a girl. So seeing him with a boy eliminates not only the combinations where he has two girls, but also the combinations where he has a son and a daughter and chooses the daughter to walk with.

So, while it is certainly true that every possible Mr. Smith has at least one boy (i.e., the condition is necessary), it cannot be assumed that every Mr. Smith with at least one boy is intended. That is, the problem statement does not say that having a boy is a sufficient condition for Mr. Smith to be identified as having a boy this way.

Commenting on Gardner's version of the problem, Bar-Hillel and Falk note that "Mr. Smith, unlike the reader, is presumably aware of the sex of both of his children when making this statement", i.e. that "I have two children and at least one of them is a boy." It must be further assumed that Mr. Smith would always report this fact if it were true, and either remain silent or say he has at least one daughter, for the correct answer to be  as Gardner apparently originally intended. But under that assumption, if he remains silent or says he has a daughter, there is a 100% probability he has two daughters.

Analysis of the ambiguity
If it is assumed that this information was obtained by looking at both children to see if there is at least one boy, the condition is both necessary and sufficient. Three of the four equally probable events for a two-child family in the sample space above meet the condition, as in this table:

However, if the family was first selected and then a random, true statement was made about the sex of one child in that family, whether or not both were considered, the correct way to calculate the conditional probability is not to count all of the cases that include a child with that sex. Instead, one must consider only the probabilities where the statement will be made in each case. So, if ALOB represents the event where the statement is "at least one boy", and ALOG represents the event where the statement is "at least one girl", then this table describes the sample space:

So, if at least one is a boy when the fact is chosen randomly, the probability that both are boys is

The paradox occurs when it is not known how the statement "at least one is a boy" was generated. Either answer could be correct, based on what is assumed.

However, the "" answer is obtained only by assuming P(ALOB|BG) = P(ALOB|GB) =1, which implies P(ALOG|BG) = P(ALOG|GB) = 0, that is, the other child's sex is never mentioned although it is present. As Marks and Smith say, "This extreme assumption is never included in the presentation of the two-child problem, however, and is surely not what people have in mind when they present it."

Modelling the generative process
Another way to analyse the ambiguity (for question 2) is by making explicit the generative process (all draws are independent).
 The following process leads to answer :
 Draw  equiprobably from 
 Draw  equiprobably from 
 Discard cases where there is no B
 Observe 
 The following process leads to answer :
 Draw  equiprobably from 
 Draw  equiprobably from 
 Draw index  equiprobably from 
 Observe

Bayesian analysis 

Following classical probability arguments, we consider a large urn containing two children. We assume equal probability that either is a boy or a girl. The three discernible cases are thus:

 both are girls (GG) – with probability P(GG) = , 
 both are boys (BB) – with probability of P(BB) = , and 
 one of each (G·B) – with probability of P(G·B) = .

These are the prior probabilities.

Now we add the additional assumption that "at least one is a boy" = B. Using Bayes' Theorem, we find

where P(A|B) means "probability of A given B". 
P(B|BB) = probability of at least one boy given both are boys = 1.
P(BB) = probability of both boys =  from the prior distribution.
P(B) = probability of at least one being a boy, which includes cases BB and G·B =  +  = .

The paradox arises because the second assumption is somewhat artificial, and when describing the problem in an actual setting things get a bit sticky. Just how do we know that "at least" one is a boy? One description of the problem states that we look into a window, see only one child and it is a boy. This sounds like the same assumption. However, this one is equivalent to "sampling" the distribution (i.e. removing one child from the urn, ascertaining that it is a boy, then replacing). Let's call the statement "the sample is a boy" proposition "b". Now we have:

The difference here is the P(b), which is just the probability of drawing a boy from all possible cases (i.e. without the "at least"), which is clearly .

The Bayesian analysis generalizes easily to the case in which we relax the 50:50 population assumption. If we have no information about the populations then we assume a "flat prior", i.e. P(GG) = P(BB) = P(G·B) = . In this case the "at least" assumption produces the result P(BB|B) = , and the sampling assumption produces P(BB|b) = , a result also derivable from the Rule of Succession.

Martingale analysis 

Suppose one had wagered that Mr. Smith had two boys, and received fair odds. One pays $1 and they will receive $4 if he has two boys. Their wager will increase in value as good news arrives. What evidence would make them happier about their investment? Learning that at least one child out of two is a boy, or learning that at least one child out of one is a boy?

The latter is a priori less likely, and therefore better news. That is why the two answers cannot be the same.

Now for the numbers. If we bet on one child and win, the value of their investment has doubled. It must double again to get to $4, so the odds are 1 in 2.

On the other hand if one were learn that at least one of two children is a boy, the investment increases as if they had wagered on this question. Our $1 is now worth $. To get to $4 we still have to increase our wealth threefold. So the answer is 1 in 3.

Variants of the question 

Following the popularization of the paradox by Gardner it has been presented and discussed in various forms. The first variant presented by Bar-Hillel & Falk is worded as follows:
 Mr. Smith is the father of two. We meet him walking along the street with a young boy whom he proudly introduces as his son. What is the probability that Mr. Smith's other child is also a boy?
Bar-Hillel & Falk use this variant to highlight the importance of considering the underlying assumptions. However, someone may argue that "...before Mr. Smith identifies the boy as his son, we know only that he is either the father of two boys, BB, or of two girls, GG, or of one of each in either birth order, i.e., BG or GB. Assuming again independence and equiprobability, we begin with a probability of  that Smith is the father of two boys. Discovering that he has at least one boy rules out the event GG.

The natural assumption is that Mr. Smith selected the child companion at random. Bar-Hillel & Falk, however, suggest an alternative scenario. They imagine a culture in which boys are invariably chosen over girls as walking companions.

In 1991, Marilyn vos Savant responded to a reader who asked her to answer a variant of the Boy or Girl paradox that included beagles. In 1996, she published the question again in a different form. The 1991 and 1996 questions, respectively were phrased:
 A shopkeeper says she has two new baby beagles to show you, but she doesn't know whether they're male, female, or a pair. You tell her that you want only a male, and she telephones the fellow who's giving them a bath. "Is at least one a male?" she asks him. "Yes!" she informs you with a smile. What is the probability that the other one is a male?
 Say that a woman and a man (who are unrelated) each have two children. We know that at least one of the woman's children is a boy and that the man's oldest child is a boy. Can you explain why the chances that the woman has two boys do not equal the chances that the man has two boys?

In response to reader response that questioned her analysis vos Savant conducted a survey of readers with exactly two children, at least one of which is a boy. Of 17,946 responses, 35.9% reported two boys.

Vos Savant's articles were discussed by Carlton and Stansfield in a 2005 article in The American Statistician. The authors do not discuss the possible ambiguity in the question and conclude that her answer is correct from a mathematical perspective, given the assumptions that the likelihood of a child being a boy or girl is equal, and that the sex of the second child is independent of the first. With regard to her survey they say it "at least validates vos Savant's correct assertion that the "chances" posed in the original question, though similar-sounding, are different, and that the first probability is certainly nearer to 1 in 3 than to 1 in 2."

Carlton and Stansfield go on to discuss the common assumptions in the Boy or Girl paradox. They demonstrate that in reality male children are actually more likely than female children, and that the sex of the second child is not independent of the sex of the first. The authors conclude that, although the assumptions of the question run counter to observations, the paradox still has pedagogical value, since it "illustrates one of the more intriguing applications of conditional probability." Of course, the actual probability values do not matter; the purpose of the paradox is to demonstrate seemingly contradictory logic, not actual birth rates.

Information about the child 
Suppose we were told not only that Mr. Smith has two children, and one of them is a boy, but also that the boy was born on a Tuesday: does this change the previous analyses? Again, the answer depends on how this information was presented – what kind of selection process produced this knowledge.

Following the tradition of the problem, suppose that in the population of two-child families, the sex of the two children is independent of one another, equally likely boy or girl, and that the birth date of each child is independent of the other child.

From Bayes' Theorem that the probability of two boys, given that one boy was born on a Tuesday is given by:

Assume that the probability of being born on a Tuesday is ε =  which will be set after arriving at the general solution. The second factor in the numerator is simply , the probability of having two boys. For the denominator, let us decompose:. 
Each term is weighted with probability . Therefore, the full equation is:

For , this reduces to 

In other words, as more and more details about the boy child are given (for instance: born on January 1), the chance that the other child is a girl approaches one half.

To understand why this is, imagine Marilyn vos Savant's poll of readers had asked which day of the week boys in the family were born. If Marilyn then divided the whole data set into seven groups – one for each day of the week a son was born – six out of seven families with two boys would be counted in two groups (the group for the day of the week of birth boy 1, and the group of the day of the week of birth for boy 2), doubling, in every group, the probability of a boy-boy combination.

However, is it really plausible that the family with at least one boy born on a Tuesday was produced by choosing just one of such families at random? It is much more easy to imagine the following scenario.
 We know Mr. Smith has two children. We knock at his door and a boy comes and answers the door. We ask the boy on what day of the week he was born.
Assume that which of the two children answers the door is determined by chance. Then the procedure was (1) pick a two-child family at random from all two-child families (2) pick one of the two children at random, (3) see if it is a boy and ask on what day he was born. This is a very different procedure from (1) picking a two-child family at random from all families with two children, at least one a boy, born on a Tuesday.

This variant of the boy and girl problem is discussed on many internet blogs and is the subject of a paper by Ruma Falk. The moral of the story is that these probabilities do not just depend on the known information, but on how that information was obtained.

Psychological investigation

From the position of statistical analysis the relevant question is often ambiguous and as such there is no "correct" answer. However, this does not exhaust the boy or girl paradox for it is not necessarily the ambiguity that explains how the intuitive probability is derived. A survey such as vos Savant's suggests that the majority of people adopt an understanding of Gardner's problem that if they were consistent would lead them to the  probability answer but overwhelmingly people intuitively arrive at the  probability answer. Ambiguity notwithstanding, this makes the problem of interest to psychological researchers who seek to understand how humans estimate probability.

Fox & Levav (2004) used the problem (called the Mr. Smith problem, credited to Gardner, but not worded exactly the same as Gardner's version) to test theories of how people estimate conditional probabilities. In this study, the paradox was posed to participants in two ways:
"Mr. Smith says: 'I have two children and at least one of them is a boy.' Given this information, what is the probability that the other child is a boy?"
"Mr. Smith says: 'I have two children and it is not the case that they are both girls.' Given this information, what is the probability that both children are boys?"
The authors argue that the first formulation gives the reader the mistaken impression that there are two possible outcomes for the "other child", whereas the second formulation gives the reader the impression that there are four possible outcomes, of which one has been rejected (resulting in  being the probability of both children being boys, as there are 3 remaining possible outcomes, only one of which is that both of the children are boys). The study found that 85% of participants answered  for the first formulation, while only 39% responded that way to the second formulation. The authors argued that the reason people respond differently to each question (along with other similar problems, such as the Monty Hall Problem and the Bertrand's box paradox) is because of the use of naive heuristics that fail to properly define the number of possible outcomes.

See also
 Bertrand paradox (probability)
 Necktie paradox
 Sleeping Beauty problem
 St. Petersburg paradox
 Two envelopes problem
 List of paradoxes

References

External links
 At Least One Girl at MathPages
 A Problem With Two Bear Cubs
 Lewis Carroll's Pillow Problem
 When intuition and math probably look wrong

Probability theory paradoxes
Probability problems